Lenarue is an unincorporated community and coal town in  Harlan County, Kentucky, United States. Its post office is closed.

References

Unincorporated communities in Harlan County, Kentucky
Unincorporated communities in Kentucky
Coal towns in Kentucky